The Delta State–Mississippi College football rivalry, commonly known as the Heritage Bell Classic, is a college football rivalry game between a public university and a private Christian college in the U.S. state of Mississippi, the Delta State University Statesmen and the Mississippi College Choctaws. The current winner is Delta State, who won, 52-38, on October 29, 2022. Delta State leads the all-time series, 24–16–2.

History

Background: 1935–1994
The Delta State Statesmen were co-founding members of the Gulf South Conference in 1970. Mississippi College joined the conference in 1972 and played 23 straight games with the Statesmen before the Choctaws left the conference in 1996 which halted the series. The Choctaws left the conference and NCAA Division II to compete at the NCAA Division III level until 2014, when they rejoined the conference and continued the series with Delta State.

The annual battle between Delta State and Mississippi College was one of the most anticipated contests in the Magnolia State from 1973 to 1995.

Game results

See also  
 List of NCAA college football rivalry games

References

College football rivalries in the United States
Delta State Statesmen football
Mississippi College Choctaws football
1935 establishments in Mississippi